This is a list of some notable people affiliated with Amherst College.

Notable alumni

College founders and presidents

Edward Jones 1826, Principal of forerunner of Fourah Bay College, Africa (the predecessor of the University of Sierra Leone) 
Patrick Hues Mell 1833, Chancellor of the University of Georgia
Edward Duffield Neill 1842, first Chancellor, University of Minnesota, 1858–1861; founder, first president, and professor, Macalester College
William S. Clark 1848, second president of the Massachusetts Agricultural College (now the University of Massachusetts Amherst), co-founder of Sapporo Agricultural College (now Hokkaido University) in Japan
Julius Hawley Seelye 1849, fifth president of Amherst College (implemented the Latin honors system)
Reverend Daniel Bliss 1852, founder and president of American University of Beirut (1866–1902)
James Griswold Merrill, president of Fisk University (1901–1908)
Francis Amasa Walker 1860, third president of MIT (1881–1897)
George Harris 1866, seventh president of Amherst College
William Jacob Holland 1869, fifth Chancellor, University of Pittsburgh
Joseph Hardy Neesima 1870, founder of Doshisha University in Japan
Frank Johnson Goodnow 1879, third president of Johns Hopkins University
Benjamin Rush Rhees 1883, third president of the University of Rochester (1900–1935)
James Hayden Tufts 1884, acting president, vice-president, dean, and professor, University of Chicago
Frederic B. Pratt 1887, president of Pratt Institute (1893–1937)
Bertrand Snell 1894, president of Clarkson University (1920–1945)
 Ernest Hatch Wilkins 1900, president of Oberlin College (1927–1946)
Stanley King 1903, eleventh president of Amherst College
J. Seelye Bixler 1916, 16th president of Colby College
Lewis Williams Douglas 1916, ninth Principal of McGill University
Dexter Keezer 1918, president of Reed College
Charles W. Cole 1927, twelfth president of Amherst College
Richard Glenn Gettell 1933, thirteenth president of Mount Holyoke College
David Truman 1935, fifteenth president of Mount Holyoke College
John W. Atherton 1939, founding president of Pitzer College
Calvin Plimpton 1939, thirteenth president of Amherst College; president of Downstate Medical Center and American University of Beirut
Julian Gibbs 1947, fifteenth president of Amherst College
Charles R. Longsworth 1951, president of Hampshire College, founding vice-president
 Ralph Z. Sorenson 1955, seventh president of Babson College (1974–1981), one of co-founders of the Asian Institute of Management (AIM) in the Philippines
Richard M. Freeland 1963, president of Northeastern University (1996–2006)
David K. Lewis 1964, interim president, provost and dean of faculty, professor, Connecticut College
Colin Diver 1965, current president of Reed College
Richard L. McCormick 1969, former president of Rutgers University; former president of the University of Washington, 1995–2002; vice-chancellor and provost of the University of North Carolina at Chapel Hill
 William S. Pfeiffer 1969, current president of Warren Wilson College
Peter Dorman 1970, 15th president of American University of Beirut
Alan Townsend 1988, current interim president of Colorado College

Academics

Philologist and lexicographer Francis Andrew March 1845, principal founder of modern comparative linguistics in Anglo-Saxon
Geologist Benjamin Kendall Emerson 1865, geologist, author, and professor
Political Scientist John Burgess 1867, one of the founders of modern political science
Historian Herbert Baxter Adams 1872, writings introduced scientific methods of investigation, credited with bringing study of politics into realm of social sciences
Librarian Melvil Dewey 1874, of the Dewey Decimal System, founder of American Library Association
Economist John Bates Clark 1875, namesake of the John Bates Clark Medal
Statistician Richmond Mayo-Smith 1875, at the time one of the foremost authorities on the subject
Astronomer David Peck Todd 1875, noted astronomer, leader of significant astronomical expeditions
Political Scientist Frank Johnson Goodnow 1879, scholar of public administration and administrative law, advisor in drafting Chinese constitution in 1913–14 (appears above)
Librarian Ernest Cushing Richardson 1880, noted librarian, theologian and scholar
Historian, author, librarian Frederic Bancroft 1882, namesake of the Bancroft Prize
Philosopher James Hayden Tufts 1884, co-founder of University of Chicago School of Pragmatism
Psychologist Edmund B. Delabarre 1886, pioneer in shape perception, among other fields
Astronomer Raymond Smith Dugan 1899, discovered 16 Asteroids (including 516 Amherstia), wrote standard two volume textbook
Historian Preserved Smith 1901, historian of Protestant Reformation; Prof. at Amherst, Harvard
Economist John Maurice Clark 1905, best known forerunner of American school of pragmatic economics
Educator Claude Fuess 1905, a noted author and historian, 10th Headmaster of Phillips Academy, Andover, Massachusetts
Educator and philosopher Scott Buchanan 1916, founder of Great Books program at St. John's College
E. Merrill Root 1917, writer, educator, and opponent of communism and liberal intrusion into the educational system
Gerald Warner Brace 1922, writer, educator, sailor and boat builder
Sociologist Talcott Parsons 1924, one of the most influential sociologists during much of the 20th century; Professor at Harvard from 1927 to 1973.
Chemist Paul Doughty Bartlett 1928, revolutionized the way organic chemistry is taught and practiced in the world
Mathematician Stephen Cole Kleene 1930, helped lay foundations for theoretical computer science
Chemist William Summer Johnson 1936, among the world's leading synthetic organic chemists
American historian, professor, and activist H. Stuart Hughes 1937
Historian John Whitney Hall 1939, pioneer in field of Japanese studies, authority on pre-war Japan
Poet and professor Richard P. Wilbur 1942, second U.S. Poet Laureate; Amherst College professor Robert Frost was Wilbur's teacher and mentor
 Linguist and professor Eric P. Hamp 1942, LHD (hon.)'72, The University of Chicago, known for expertise in lesser-known Indo-European languages and dialects.
Poet and translator David Ferry 1946, recipient of the Bobbitt National Prize for Poetry
Chemist Julian Howard Gibbs 1947, former President of Amherst College (won the High Polymer Prize of the American Physical Society, 1967)
Neuroscientist James Olds 1947, one of the foremost psychologists of the twentieth century
Political Scientist Richard Fenno 1948, namesake of Fenno's paradox and Richard F. Fenno Jr. Prize
Physicist Henry Way Kendall 1950, experimental work provided first evidence of quarks and quark model
Microbiologist Carl R. Woese 1950, redrew taxonomic tree, originator of RNA world hypothesis
Political Scientist Andrew Hacker 1951, novel interdisciplinary work on questions of race, class, and gender
Physical chemist Peter Toennies 1952, former director of the Max Planck Institute for Flow Research; recipient, inter alia, of Physics Award of the Göttingen Academy of Sciences, Stern-Geriach Gold Medal (experimental physics), Kolos Medal (chemistry) (2005), and Benjamin Franklin Medal in Physics (2006)
Translator and poet Robert Fagles 1955, known for translations of ancient Greek classics, particularly translations of epic poems of Homer
Economist Edmund Phelps 1955, seminal work, natural rate of unemployment, Golden Rule savings rate
Political Scientist Alan Schechter 1957
Scientist David Suzuki 1958, internationally honoured Canadian environmental scientist and activist
Historian John W. Dower 1959, scholar of modern Japanese history, Bancroft Prize
Economist David Bradford 1960, economist, professor at Princeton University
Planetary scientist Andrew Ingersoll 1960, recipient of Kuiper Prize (2007)
Philosopher and law professor James Boyd White 1960, founder of "Law and Literature" movement
MIT Institute Professor John M. Deutch 1961, chairman of Chemistry Dept., Dean of Science, Provost
Musicologist and musician Philip Gossett 1963, one of the world's leading authorities on 19th century Italian music; Prof., Univ. of Chicago and Univ. of Rome
Psychologist Roger Tarpy 1963, author of numerous textbooks on learning and memory
Economist Joseph E. Stiglitz 1964, John Bates Clark Medal; former professor at Oxford, Yale, Stanford, and Princeton; work in the theory of markets with asymmetric information and efficiency wages
Sterling Professor of French R. Howard Bloch 1965, Bibliotheque National, Ordre des Arts et des Lettres
Physical Chemist Robert W. Field 1965, recipient, inter alia, of the Broida Prize, Plyler Prize, Lippincott Award, and Nobel Laureate Signature Award
Physicist Davison E. Soper 1965, recipient of the 2009 Sakurai Prize for Theoretical Particle Physics
Philosopher William Lycan 1966, contributions to philosophy of language, mind, epistemology, linguistics
Historian Theodore Rosengarten 1966, scholar of U.S. Southern history
Computer scientist David S. Johnson 1967, computer scientist, head of Algorithms and Optimization Department (research) at AT&T Labs (former Bell Labs)
Bestselling author Daniel Goleman 1968
Anthropologist Loring Danforth 1971, award-winning scholar; pre-eminent expert, Macedonia naming dispute
Ecologist Peter Vitousek 1971, professor of biology at Stanford University; member of the National Academy of Sciences (1992)
Astronomer David Helfand 1973, chair of the department of Astronomy at Columbia University, co-director of Columbia Astrophysics Laboratory, professor in physics department
Ethnomusicologist Theodore Levin 1973
Geophysicist, earth and planetary scientist, and astronomer Raymond Jeanloz 1975
Historian Peter Jelavich 1975, professor of history, Johns Hopkins University, specializing in the cultural history of modern Germany
Historian Walter Johnson 1988, Winthrop Professor of History, Harvard University
Economist Gilbert E. Metcalf 1975, John DiBiaggio Professor of Citizenship and Public Service and professor of economics, Tufts University, specializing in taxation, energy, and climate policy
Mathematician and political scientist Joshua M. Epstein 1976, pioneer in agent based models; modeling of social, economic, and biological systems; groundbreaking work on epidemics and bioterrorism
Historian, author of books on the Vietnam War Christian Appy 1977
Historian Andrew R. Heinze 1977
Bioethicist Ezekiel J. Emanuel 1979, leading medical ethicist
Timothy Luehrman 1979, finance academic (corporate finance and real options)
Rajiv Ratan 1981, scientist
Andrew Kuchins 1981, political scientist and former President of American University of Central Asia
Chemist Amy Rosenzweig 1988, leader in advancing synchrotron-based protein crystallography
Joseph M. Hall, Jr., 1991, Professor of American History, Bates College
Political Scientist Sumantra Bose 1992, professor of Internatl. & Comp. Pol., London School of Economics
Law professor and television correspondent Stephen Vladeck 2001
Art historian Charles C. Eldredge, 1966, Hall Distinguished Professor of American Art and Culture Emeritus, University of Kansas

Professional athletes and coaches

Steve Partenheimer 1913, third baseman, Detroit Tigers, 1913
Howard Groskloss 1930, infielder, Pittsburgh Pirates, 1930–1932
Harry Dalton 1950, general manager Baltimore Orioles 1965–1971, Los Angeles Angels 1971–1977, Milwaukee Brewers 1977–1991
Doug Swift 1970, linebacker, Miami Dolphins, 1970–1975
Jean Fugett 1972, tight end, Dallas Cowboys 1972–1975, and Washington Redskins, 1976–1979
Freddie Scott 1974, wide receiver, Baltimore Colts, 1974–77, and Detroit Lions 1978–1983
Richard N. Thompson 1980, pitcher, Cleveland Indians, 1985, and Montreal Expos, 1989–1990
John J. Cerutti 1982, pitcher, Toronto Blue Jays, 1985–1990, and Detroit Tigers, 1991
Dave Jauss 1980, bench coach, New York Mets, 2009–present
Dan Duquette, 1980, general manager, Montreal Expos 1991–1994, Boston Red Sox 1994–2002, Baltimore Orioles 2011–2018
Neal Huntington 1991, general manager, Pittsburgh Pirates, 2007–2019
Ben Cherington 1996, general manager, Boston Red Sox, 2011–2015
Alex Bernstein 1997, offensive lineman, Baltimore Ravens, New York Jets, Cleveland Browns, Atlanta Falcons, 1997–2000
 Willy Workman (born 1990), American-Israeli basketball player for Hapoel Jerusalem in the Israeli Basketball Premier League

Clergy and Biblical scholars

Missionary and linguist Isaac Grout Bliss 1844, translator of the Bible into Kurdish
Missionary and linguist David Oliver Allen 1823, first American Protestant missionary appointed to Bombay, India; first translation of the Bible in the Mahratta language
Biblical scholar Bela Bates Edwards 1824, also editor-in-chief of Bibliotheca Sacra, the oldest continuous theological journal in the United States
Missionary and scholar Elijah Coleman Bridgman 1826, the first American Protestant missionary appointed to China, America's first "China expert"
John H. Burt, Episcopal priest and Eighth bishop of the Episcopal Dicese of Ohio (1967–1983)
Missionary and linguist Justin Perkins 1829, first American Protestant missionary appointed to Iran
Biblical scholar Horatio Balch Hackett 1830
Preacher Henry Ward Beecher 1834
Archbishop James Roosevelt Bayley ex 1835, eighth Archbishop of Baltimore
Roswell Dwight Hitchcock 1836, president of Union Theological Seminary (1880–87)
Preacher Benjamin M. Palmer ex 1836, acclaimed orator, Bible-based theologian; confederate preacher
Bishop Frederic Dan Huntington 1839, first Episcopal bishop of Episcopal Diocese of Central New York
Biblical scholar Henry Preserved Smith 1869, professor at Amherst College (1897–1906)
William Greenough Thayer 1885, Episcopal minister and headmaster of headmaster of St. Mark's School
Christian thinker Uchimura Kanzo 1887, founder of Nonchurch Movement of Christianity in Japan
Theologian Robert McAfee Brown 1943, Presbyterian minister, theologian, international leader and activist in social justice, civil rights, and ecumenical causes
Canadian Anglican priest Roland de Corneille 1947, human rights activist
Farzam Arbab 1964, member of the Universal House of Justice, the supreme governing body of the Baháʼí Faith
Clark Lowenfield 1980, bishop of the Anglican Diocese of the Western Gulf Coast
Buddhist scholar, teacher, and practitioner B. Alan Wallace 1987, translator for dozens of Tibetan lamas in India, Europe, and North America, including the Dalai Lama

Presidents, prime ministers, and other heads of national government
Calvin Coolidge 1895, 30th President of the United States (1923–1929)
George Papandreou 1975, former Prime Minister of Greece (2009–11) and Minister for Foreign Affairs (1999–2004, 2009–10)
Antonis Samaras 1974, former Prime Minister of Greece (2012–2015) and leader of New Democracy (2009–2015); Minister for Foreign Affairs (1989–92)
Uhuru Muigai Kenyatta 1985, 4th President of Kenya (2013–2022).

Royalty
Albert II 1981, Sovereign Prince of Monaco (2005–)

Cabinet members

Horace Maynard 1838, Postmaster General, cabinet of Rutherford Hayes (prior to 1972, a cabinet office)
Charles H. Allen 1869, Assistant Secretary of the Navy replacing Theodore Roosevelt in McKinley administration
Robert Lansing 1886, United States Secretary of State 1915–1920; nominal head, US Commission to the Paris Peace Conference
William Henry Lewis 1892, first African-American appointed to a sub-cabinet position, Assistant United States Attorney General
Harlan Fiske Stone 1894, United States Attorney General
Calvin Coolidge 1895, twenty-ninth Vice-President of the United States (1921–1923) (appears above)
William F. Whiting 1896, Secretary of Commerce (1928–1929)
Lewis W. Douglas 1916, Director of the Budget, now Office of Management and Budget
John J. McCloy 1919, Assistant United States Secretary of War (1941–1945)
Amon Nikoi 1953, Senior Principal Secretary of the Ministry of Finance; Minister of Finance and Economic Planning (Ghana)
David Bradford 1960, former member of President's Council of Economic Advisors
John M. Deutch 1960, U.S. Director of Central Intelligence in Bill Clinton administration; United States Deputy Secretary of Defense
Joseph E. Stiglitz 1964, former member and Chairman of the President's Council of Economic Advisors
Antonis Samaras 1974, Greek Leader of the Opposition and President of New Democracy; Minister for Foreign Affairs (1989–92)
Francisco G. Flores 1981, former Secretary of Information; President of Congress (El Salvador) (appears above)
Stavros Lambrinidis 1984, Minister for Foreign Affairs of Greece (2011)
Kevin McAleenan 1994, Acting Secretary of Homeland Security (2019)

United States Supreme Court
Harlan Fiske Stone 1894, Associate Justice (1925–1941) and twelfth Chief Justice (1941–1946); the only justice physically to have filled all nine seats on the bench of the United States Supreme Court, having moved by seniority from the most junior Associate Justice to the most senior Associate Justice to the Chief Justice; principal role in upholding President Franklin D. Roosevelt's New Deal programs

Diplomats and government officials

John Elliot Ward ex 1835, U.S. Minister to China, elected acting Lieut. Gov. of Georgia, U.S. Attorney (GA)
Horace Maynard 1838, Minister to Turkey in Administration of Ulysses S. Grant (appears above)
Edward Duffield Neill 1842, consul to Dublin (appears above)
 John C. Caldwell 1855, Min. to Uruguay and Paraguay; con. to Valparaiso, Chile, and San José, Costa Rica
 Francis Amasa Walker 1860, Chief of U.S. Bureau of Statistics, Director of both 9th and 10th U.S. census
 Arthur Sherburne Hardy ex 1869, Minister Plenipotentiary (Ambassador) to Persia, Greece, Romania, Serbia, Switzerland, and Spain
 Walter Wyman 1870, third Surgeon General of the United States
 Frank C. Partridge 1882, Solicitor of the Department of State; Min. to Venezuela; con. general to Tangier, Morocco
 Sir Herbert Ames 1885, financial director, Secretariat of the League of Nations (Member of Parliament, Canada)
 Sir Chentung Liang-Cheng 1885, Ambassador of China to the United States
 Dwight Morrow 1895, Ambassador to Mexico, chairman of the Morrow Board
 Joseph Bartlett Eastman 1904, Interstate Commerce Commissioner (1919–1944); Federal Coordinator of Railroads
 Dr.Warren Fales Draper 1906, Deputy Surgeon General of the United States Public Health Service (see Physicians)
 Leland Olds 1912, Chairman of the Federal Power Commission under President Franklin D. Roosevelt
 Lewis W. Douglas 1916, head, War Shipping Administration; Ambassador to the United Kingdom
 John J. McCloy 1919, second president of the World Bank, member of the Warren Commission and Draper Committee (appears above)
 Robert H. Thayer 1922, Minister to Romania, Asst. Secretary of State for Ed. and Cultural Affairs
 George Yeh 1925, Ambassador to the U.S. from the Republic of China (Taiwan) 
 Charles W. Cole 1927, ambassador to Chile, director of the Federal Reserve Bank of Boston, president of Amherst College
 Toshikazu Kase 1927, Japan's first Ambassador to the United Nations
 Philip Hall Coombs 1937, first Assistant Secretary of State for Educational and Cultural Affairs
 Robert G. Neumann 1940 MA, Ambassador to Afghanistan, Morocco, and Saudi Arabia
 Talcott Williams Seelye 1944, Ambassador to Syria, Tunisia, Saudi Arabia; U.S. Presidential Envoy to Lebanon
 Edward Ney 1946, Ambassador to Canada
 Harry G. Barnes, Jr. 1949, Ambassador to Chile, India, and Romania
 Ulric Haynes 1952, Ambassador to Algeria, staff member of the National Security Council
 Amon Nikoi 1953, Permanent Representative of Ghana to the United Nations; Executive Director of the International Monetary Fund; Chairman and Governor of the Board of Directors of the Bank of Ghana 
 Hiroaki Fujii 1958, Ambassador of Japan to Thailand, Great Britain (current president of the Japan Foundation)
 David Bradford 1960, Deputy Assistant Secretary for Tax Policy, U.S. Department of the Treasury (appears above)
 Harold E. Varmus 1961, Director of the National Institutes of Health (1993–2000)
 Joseph E. Stiglitz 1964, Senior Vice-President and Chief Economist of the World Bank (appears above)
 Kenneth Bacon 1966, Department of Defense spokesman who later served as president of Refugees International
 David Kessler 1973, head of Food and Drug Administration (1990–1997)
 Jeff Bleich 1983, Ambassador to Australia
 Sarah Bloom Raskin 1983, Deputy Secretary of the Treasury (2014–)
 Stavros Lambrinidis 1984, European Union Special Representative for Human Rights (2011–)
 Catherine Lhamon 1993, Chair, U.S. Commission on Civil Rights; Assistant Secretary for Civil Rights, U.S. Department of Education

Senators, Representatives, and other politicians

 Representative Edward Dickinson 1823, father of Emily
 Representative Lincoln Clark 1825 (Iowa) (Attorney General of Alabama and circuit judge)
 Representative James Humphrey 1831 (New York)
 Robert Purvis 1831(?), antebellum African-American abolitionist, supporter of Underground Railroad
 Representative Nathan Belcher 1832 (Connecticut) (state legislator and lawyer)
 Representative Lucien Barbour 1837 (Indiana) (U.S. Attorney)
 State Representative Edward Ralph May 1837 (did not graduate), sole delegate to the Indiana Constitutional Convention of 1850 to support African American suffrage.
 Representative David Stuart 1838 (Michigan) (President Abraham Lincoln appointed him brigadier general in Civil War)
 Representative Horace Maynard (Tennessee) 1838 (Attorney General of Tennessee) (appears above)
 Senator Samuel Clarke Pomeroy ex (1836–38) (Kansas) (mayor; railroad president)
 John P. Sanderson 1839, member of Provisional Confederate Congress (Florida)
 Representative Martin R. Thayer ex 1840 (Pennsylvania) (state judge)
 Representative Charles Delano 1840 (Massachusetts)
 Representative Waldo Hutchins 1842 (New York)
 Speaker of the House Galusha A. Grow 1844 (Pennsylvania) (24th Speaker) (railroad president)
 Representative Julius H. Seelye 1849 (Massachusetts) (president of Amherst College) (appears above)
 Representative Charles P. Thompson 1846 (Massachusetts) (U.S. Assistant D. A. and judge)
 Representative Samuel M. Arnell 1844(?) (Tennessee)
 Representative William Whiting II 1862 (Massachusetts) (state legislator and mayor)
 Representative William Shadrach Knox 1865 (Massachusetts)
 Representative Francis W. Rockwell 1868 (Massachusetts) (state legislator and judge)
 Representative Charles H. Allen 1869 (Massachusetts) (appears above)
 Representative Caleb R. Layton 1873 (Delaware) (Delaware Secretary of State and physician)
 Representative Lewis Sperry 1873 (Connecticut) (state legislator and lawyer)
 Senator and "Speaker of the House" Frederick H. Gillett 1874 (Massachusetts) (37th Speaker)
 Representative Henry Stockbridge, Jr. 1877 (Maryland) (Regent of the University of Maryland)
 Representative George H. Utter 1877 (Rhode Island)
 Representative George P. Lawrence 1880 (Massachusetts) (state legislator and judge)
 Senator Frank C. Partridge 1882 (Vermont) (appears above)
 Speaker of the House Henry T. Rainey 1883 (Illinois) (40th Speaker)
 Representative Edward Bassett 1884 (New York) (a founding father of modern-day urban planning)
 Member of Parliament in Canada Sir Herbert Ames 1885 (appears above)
 Representative Allen T. Treadway 1886 (Massachusetts) (in office sixteen consecutive terms)
 William Estabrook Chancellor 1889, nemesis of Warren G. Harding
 Representative George B. Churchill 1889 (Massachusetts) (professor at Amherst College)
 Representative and "House minority leader" Bertrand Snell 1894 (New York) (appears above)
 Representative Charles B. Law 1895 (New York)
 Senator Dwight Morrow 1895 (New Jersey) (appears above)
 Representative Albert E. Austin 1899 (Connecticut) (physician and stepfather of Clare Boothe Luce)
 Representative Foster Waterman Stearns 1903 (New Hampshire) (regent of the Smithsonian Institution)
 Representative Bruce Fairchild Barton 1907 (New York)
 Representative Lewis W. Douglas 1916 (Arizona) (appears above) (Council on Foreign Relations)
 Representative Augustus W. Bennet 1918 (New York)
 Senator Kingsley A. Taft 1925 (Ohio) (judge and chief justice of Ohio Supreme Court)
 Representative John Michael Murphy ex 1943 (New York)
 Representative Thomas Ballenger 1948 (Ohio) (served consecutive terms, 1986–2005)
 Member of Parliament in Canada Roland de Corneille 1947 (appears above)
 Senator Thomas F. Eagleton 1950 (Missouri) (1969–1987), one-time running mate of George McGovern (Missouri Attorney General and Lieutenant Governor)
 Richard W. DeKorte 1957 New Jersey, Energy Czar and former member and majority leader of the New Jersey General Assembly
 Representative Robert H. Steele 1960 (Connecticut, 1970–1975)
 Paul Offner 1964 Wisconsin State Legislature, and educator
 Stephen Hartgen 1966, Idaho House of Representatives (2008–current) and former editor and publisher of the Times-News
 Representative Thomas M. Davis III 1971 (Virginia)
 Eric Kriss 1971, former Massachusetts Secretary for Finance and Administration
 Samuel I. Rosenberg 1972, member of the Maryland House of Delegates; law professor
 Peter Franchot 1973, Maryland Comptroller and former member of the Maryland House of Delegates
 Representative Martin Hoke 1973 (Ohio) (1993–1997)
 Antonis Samaras 1974, member of the European Parliament; former member of the Greek Parliament (appears above)
 George Papandreou 1975, member of the Greek Parliament; leader of PASOK, opposition party (appears above)
 Eric T. Schneiderman 1977, New York Attorney General, former deputy minority leader
 Bradley Campbell 1983, New Jersey Commissioner, Department of Environmental Protection
 Stavros Lambrinidis 1984, member and Vice-President of European Parliament (2004–2011) from Greece (appears above)
 Senator Chris Coons 1985 (Delaware)
 Craig M. Johnson 1993, member of New York State Senate
 Rob Witwer 1993, member of Colorado House of Representatives
 Paul Rieckhoff 1998, Executive Director of Iraq and Afghanistan Veterans of America
John Buchanan Robinson, U.S. Congressman from Pennsylvania's 6th Congressional district (1891–1897)
 Erastus G. Smith, Wisconsin State Assembly and educator
 Alan Webber 1970, Mayor of Santa Fe, New Mexico (appears below)

Governors and Premiers, elected and appointed

Alexander H. Bullock 1836, Governor of Massachusetts (state legislator, judge, and mayor)
Charles L. Robinson 1839 (?), first Governor of Kansas (1861–1863), first elected "territorial Governor" of Kansas (physician, abolitionist, and regent of the University of Kansas)
Charles Bartlett Andrews 1858, Governor of Connecticut
Dave Freudenthal 1973, twice Governor of Wyoming, former U.S. attorney
Lucius F. C. Garvin 1862, twice Governor of Rhode Island
Charles H. Allen 1869, first civil Governor of Puerto Rico (appears above)
George H. Utter 1877, Rhode Island Governor, Lieutenant Governor, and Secretary of State
Calvin Coolidge 1895, Governor, Lieutenant Governor of Massachusetts (mayor) (appears above)
John J. McCloy 1919, U.S. military Governor and High Commissioner of Germany (appears above)
William Henry Hastie 1925, first African-American civil Governor of the U.S. Virgin Islands
Adélard Godbout, Premier of Québec (1936; 1939–1944), majored in agronomy from the Amherst Agricultural College
Uhuru Muigai Kenyatta (1985–1989), studied economics, political science and government at Amherst

Lawyers and judges

Henry M. Spofford 1845, Justice, Louisiana Supreme Court
Addison Brown ex 1852, U.S. District Court judge (New York) (one of the founders of N.Y. Botanical Gardens)
Charles Bartlett Andrews 1858, Chief Justice of the Connecticut Supreme Court (appears above)
Henry Stockbridge, Jr. 1877, Judge, Maryland Court of Appeals (1911–1926) (appears above)
Albert S. Bard 1888, Lawyer and Civic Activist in New York City, Albert S. Bard Award is named after him
William H. Lewis 1888, lawyer, Assistant US Attorney General; first college football player and All-American
Luther Ely Smith 1894, lawyer and founder of Gateway Arch National Park
Harlan Fiske Stone 1894, professor and Dean of Columbia Law School (appears above)
John Teele Pratt 1896, lawyer, philanthropist, music impresario and financier
Charles Hamilton Houston 1915, legal architect of school desegregation strategy; first African-American editor of the Harvard Law Review and first to receive SJD; Spingarn Medal
John J. McCloy 1919, name partner in Milbank, Tweed, Hadley & McCloy; adviser of nine presidents
James Focht McClure, Jr. 1913, U.S. District Court Judge (Pennsylvania)
Leonard Page Moore 1919, Federal appellate judge (Second Circuit), 1957–1971; senior status, 1971; U.S. Attorney, 1953–1957
Robert H. Thayer 1922, lawyer, naval officer and diplomat
William Henry Hastie 1925, first African-American U.S. District Court judge (Virgin Islands); first black Federal appellate judge and Chief Judge (Third Circuit); dean of Howard University Law School; editor of the Harvard Law Review; Spingarn Medal
Benjamin J. Davis Jr. 1925, African-American graduate of Harvard Law School, radical lawyer, member of New York City Council, and a communist who was jailed for his beliefs
Kingsley A. Taft 1925, Chief Justice of the Ohio Supreme Court (appears above)
Donald G. Murray 1934, plaintiff in Murray v. Pearson
Nauman Scott 1934, U.S. District Court judge (Louisiana) (1970–2001)
Robert M. Morgenthau 1941, District Attorney of New York County and former U.S. Attorney
William H. Webster 1947, U.S. District Court judge (Missouri) and Federal Appellate judge (Eighth Circuit) (also U.S. Attorney, 1960–1961; awarded National Security Medal and Presidential Medal of Freedom)
Alexander M. Keith 1950, former Chief Justice of the Minnesota State Supreme Court; Lieutenant Governor of Minnesota
James J. White 1956, leading scholar of commercial law, Professor of Law at Michigan University
Philip H. Lilienthal 1962, humanitarian and AIDS activist; founder of WorldCamps
Peter Messitte 1963, U.S. District Court judge (Maryland)
James T. Giles 1964, U.S. District Court judge (Pennsylvania), Chief Judge (1999–2006)
Colin Diver 1965, former professor and Dean, University of Pennsylvania Law School (appears above)
John C. Coffee 1966, professor, Columbia Law School
William P. Alford 1970, Professor and Director of East Asian Legal Studies at Harvard Law School
Samuel H. Mays 1970, U.S. District Court judge (Tennessee)
William W. Fisher 1976, professor, Harvard Law School
William J. Kayatta Jr. 1976, U.S. Court of Appeals judge
Paul M. Smith 1976, winning attorney of Lawrence v. Texas (Supreme Court practitioner)
Eric T. Schneiderman 1977, New York Attorney General
William Z. Stuart 1811-1876, Justice of the Indiana Supreme Court
Patrick Fitzgerald 1982, U.S. Attorney; U.S. Dept. of Justice Special Counsel in charge of investigating the Valerie Plame affair
Karin Immergut 1982, U.S. Attorney
Scott Kafker 1981, Justice, Massachusetts Supreme Judicial Court
Michael P. Shea 1989, U.S. District Court judge (Connecticut)

Businesspeople

John Abele 1959, founder and director of Boston Scientific
Frank Lusk Babbott 1878, jute merchant, art collector, patron, and philanthropist
Bruce Fairchild Barton 1907, co-founder of precursor to BBDO, head of BBDO until 1961 (appears above)
Clarence Birdseye ex 1910, food preservationist, founder of Birds Eye Foods, National Inventors Hall of Fame
Charles R. Blyth 1905, investment banker, partner at Blyth, Eastman Dillon & Co.
Charles Brewer 1981, entrepreneur and founder of Mindspring Enterprises, an internet service provider
Benjamin P. Cherington 1996, vice president of player personnel for the Boston Red Sox
Wei Christianson 1985 (BA political science), co-CEO Asia of Morgan Stanley 
Daniel Collamore Heath 1868, publisher, founder of D.C. Heath and Company, now part of Houghton Mifflin
Harry Dalton 1950, executive of American Major League Baseball; general manager of three major league baseball teams
Arthur Vining Davis 1888, president and chairman of Aluminum Company of America (Alcoa); founder of Arthur Vining Davis Foundations
Daniel F. Duquette 1980, baseball executive; general manager of two major league baseball teams
Henry Clay Folger 1879, Standard Oil president, Folger Shakespeare Library founder
William E. Ford 1983, CEO of General Atlantic
 Martin S. Fox (1924–2020), publisher 
George N. Gillett, Jr. ex-chairman of Booth Creek Management Corp., owns interests in food industry and sports teams
H. Irving Grousbeck 1956, current managing partner of the Boston Celtics, co-founder of Continental Cablevision, professor at Stanford Business School
Amos Hostetter, Jr. 1958, former chief executive officer of MediaOne
Neal Huntington 1991, general manager of the Pittsburgh Pirates
Daniel Willis James 1863, head of Phelps, Dodge, and Company, philanthropist
Jeff Jordan 1981, venture capitalist; partner at Andreessen Horowitz
Eric Kriss 1971, co-founder of Bain Capital, former CEO of MediQual Systems (appears above)
Thai Lee 1980, founder and CEO of SHI International, billionaire
Richard LeFrak 1967, chairman and CEO of LeFrak
Glen Lewy 1971, member, Council on Foreign Relations; National Chair of the Anti-Defamation League; lawyer and venture capitalist
Dave MacLennan 1981, CEO of Cargill
John J. McCloy 1919, chairman of Chase Manhattan Bank, Council on Foreign Relations, and Ford Foundation
Charles E. Merrill ex 1908, founder of Merrill Lynch
John S. Middleton 1977, former owner of the John Middleton Co. and part owner of the Philadelphia Phillies of Major League Baseball (MLB)
Dwight Morrow 1895, partner at J.P. Morgan & Co.
Edward N. Ney 1946, CEO of Young & Rubicam
Frits van Paasschen 1983, former CEO of Starwood Hotels & Resorts, Worldwide, Inc.; former CEO of Coors Brewing Company
Charles Millard Pratt 1879, company secretary of Standard Oil
George Dupont Pratt 1893, conservationist and philanthropist
Harold I. Pratt 1899, oil industrialist
Herbert L. Pratt 1895, head of Standard Oil
Hugh B. Price 1963, former President of the National Urban League
Lloyd Schermer 1950, CEO of Lee Enterprises; chairman of predecessor of the Newspaper Association of America
Martin S. Schwartz 1967, Wall Street trader, author, profiled in national bestseller "Market Wizards"
Gary Shilling, financial analyst and commentator 
Winthrop H. Smith, Jr. 1971, entrepreneur; CEO of Summit Ventures; former executive vice president of Merrill Lynch; member, Council on Foreign Relations
Sung-Joo Kim 1981, chairman and CEO of MCM Group; founder and former director of Sung Joo International in South Korea
John Tarnoff 1973, senior executive at DreamWorks Animation, head of Show Development
Sigourney Thayer 1918, American theatrical producer, World War I aviator, and poet
Alan Webber 1970, former managing editor of the Harvard Business Review, co-founder of Fast Company
Robert W. Wilson (philanthropist) 1946, hedge fund manager and philanthropist
Sarah Meeker Jensen, 1977, FAIA, architect and medical planner

Directors of Central Intelligence (DCI), CIA, and the FBI
John M. Deutch 1960 (1995–96)
Stansfield Turner ex 1945 (1977–81) (president of U.S. Naval War College, 1972–74)
William H. Webster 1947 (1987–91) (FBI Director, 1978–87)

Nobel Prize winners
Henry W. Kendall 1950 (1990, Physics)
Edmund Phelps 1955 (2006, Economics)
Harold E. Varmus 1961 (1989, Physiology or Medicine)
Joseph E. Stiglitz 1964 (2001, Economics)
Jeffrey C. Hall 1967 (2017, Physiology or Medicine)

Crafoord Prize winner
Carl R. Woese 1950 (2003, Microbiology)

Pulitzer Prize winners

Alfred Friendly 1933 (1968, International Reporting)
Richard P. Wilbur 1942 (1957, Poetry; 1989, Poetry) (U.S. Poet Laureate; National Book Award; Bollingen Prize; Ruth Lilly Poetry Prize; Edna St. Vincent Millay award; Frost Medal) (appears above)
James I. Merrill 1947 (1977, Poetry) (twice named recipient of National Book Award, 1967 and 1979; National Book Critics Circle Award; Bollingen Prize; Bobbitt National Prize for Poetry)
Tad Mosel 1947 (1961, Drama)
William S. McFeely 1952 (1982, Biography) (Lincoln Prize)
John W. Dower 1959 (2000, General Non-Fiction) (National Book Award) (appears above)
Walter Allen McDougall 1968 (1986, General Non-Fiction)
Blair Kamin 1979 (1999, Criticism)
Richard Read 1980 (1999, Explanatory; 2001, Public Service (team))
Debby Applegate 1989 (2007, Biography)

MacArthur Fellowship winners

Carl R. Woese 1950, microbiologist
Theodore Rosengarten 1966, historian; National Book Award; National Book Critics Circle Award
Raymond Jeanloz 1975, geophysicist, earth and planetary scientist, and astronomer
Kellie Jones 1981, art historian and curator
Rosanne Haggerty 1982, leading creator of solutions to homelessness
David Foster Wallace 1985, novelist
Thomas W. Mitchell 1987, law professor
Amy Rosenzweig 1988, chemist
Andrea Dutton 1995, paleoclimatologist

National Medal of Science winners
Paul Doughty Bartlett 1928, chemist
Stephen Cole Kleene 1930, mathematician
William Summer Johnson 1936, chemist
Carl R. Woese 1950, microbiologist
Harold E. Varmus 1961, physician

Astronauts
Robert A. R. Parker 1958 (B.A., astronomy and physics; PhD, Caltech (Astronomy)); physicist
Jeffrey A. Hoffman 1966 (B.A., astronomy; PhD, Harvard University (Astrophysics)); astrophysicist; mem. Spanish Academy of Engineering

Engineers, inventors, and scientists

Alvan Wentworth Chapman 1830, botanist and physician, wrote the first comprehensive description of U.S flora beyond the northeast
Amiel Weeks Whipple ex 1840, military engineer, surveyor of the First transcontinental railroad
William Rutherford Mead 1867, engineer
Arthur Sherburne Hardy ex 1869, engineer, professor of civil engineering and mathematics
John Mason Clarke 1877, New York state paleontologist and geologist
L. Hamilton McCormick 1881, inventor, scientist, and author
 Frank Lewis Nason 1882 A.B., 1885 M.A., mining engineer and writer; the mineral nasonite is named after him
Hubert Lyman Clark 1892, zoologist, curator of echinoderms at Harvard, awarded Clark Medal
Robert Stanley Breed 1898, biologist
Clarence Birdseye ex 1910, father of frozen food, businessperson, National Inventors Hall of Fame
Preston Bassett 1913, charter member of NASA; pioneer in instruments for aviation; inventor, engineer
Alfred Romer 1917, paleontologist, a key figure in evolutionary research, Prof. at Chicago and Harvard
Charles Drew 1926, M.D., developed system of separating liquid blood cells from solid plasma and storing and reconstituting them
Melvin Kranzberg 1938, creator of Kranzberg's laws of technology; co-founder of Society for the History of Technology
Lloyd Conover 1947, chemist and inventor of tetracycline; National Inventors Hall of Fame
Craig Call Black 1954, paleontologist
Lewis Joel Greene 1955, American-Brazilian biochemist, Brazilian Order of Scientific Merit
Steve Baer ex 1960 (studied physics and mathematics at Amherst), inventor of the postgeodesic system called the zome
Jonathan Borden 1984, application of computer science to neurobiology; professor of neurosurgery
Julie Segre 1987, epithelial biologist, Chief of the Human Genome Research Institute
Kellyn LaCour-Conant, biologist and restoration ecologist

Physicians

Dr. Walter Wyman 1870, Surgeon General of the United States from 1891 to 1911 (appears above)
Dr. James Ewing 1888, namesake of Ewing sarcoma; eminent experimental oncologist; helped found progenitor of the American Cancer Society; responsible for the creation of present-day Memorial Sloan Kettering Cancer Center in New York City
Dr. Walter Childs Wood, 1886, chief surgeon at Brooklyn Hospital and professor of surgery at Long Island University; later a Connecticut state legislator
Dr. Warren Fales Draper 1906, Deputy Surgeon General of the United States Public Health Service and member of General Dwight Eisenhower's staff in Europe during World War II; his medical care program for miners won the Lasker Group Award in 1956
Dr. Charles R. Drew 1926, inventor of blood plasma preservation system, established first Red Cross blood bank, Spingarn Medal
Dr. Lloyd Saxon Graham 1943, epidemiologist
Dr. Harold E. Varmus 1961, Nobel Prize for his studies of the nature and control of oncogenes; former Director of the National Institutes of Health
Dr. David D. Burns 1964, influential psychotherapist, central role in the development of Cognitive Therapy
Dr. James Kocsis 1964, professor of psychiatry at Weill Cornell Medical College and Payne Whitney Psychiatric Clinic
Dr. Robert Yarchoan 1971, played a significant role in discovering and developing the first effective drugs for the treatment of AIDS
Dr. David Kessler 1973 former Head of the Food and Drug Administration, former Dean of Yale School of Medicine, and former Dean and Vice Chancellor University of California, San Francisco
Dr. Bruce D. Perry 1977, psychiatrist, internationally recognized authority on children in crisis
Dr. Ezekiel J. Emanuel 1979, Diane and Robert Levy University Professor at the University of Pennsylvania; former Chair of the Department of Bioethics at NIH
Dr. D. Drew Pinsky 1980, talk-show host

Entertainers

Playwright Clyde Fitch 1886, distinguished dramatist, wrote over 60 plays
Actor Emery B. Pottle 1899 (actor in 88 silent films and motion pictures)
Actor Burgess Meredith 1931, Academy Award–nominated
Actor Douglas Kennedy 1936, television and film actor, star of Steve Donovan, Western Marshal (1955–1956)
Playwright Tad Mosel 1947 (New York Drama Critics Award) (appears above)
Theater critic, director, playwright, author Robert Brustein 1947, founding director of Yale Repertory Theatre and American Repertory Theater; The New Republic, drama critic; Polk Award (1964)
Oscar and Emmy Award–winning composer Fred Karlin 1958
Musician and Grammy Award–winning music producer Jim Rooney 1960
Actor Ken Howard 1966, a Tony Award– and Emmy Award–winning actor
Actor Stephen Collins 1969, award-winning theater, television, and film actor
Composer Jim Steinman 1969, songwriter and producer for Meat Loaf, Bonnie Tyler, and Celine Dion
Magician Raymond J. Teller 1969, of Penn and Teller
Writer and director Henry Bromell 1970, wrote, produced Chicago Hope, Northern Exposure
Writer Robert Stuart Nathan 1970, wrote, produced ER, Law & Order
Composer Mason Daring 1971
Comedian and actor Lawrence J. Miller 1975, Max Keeble's Big Move, The Nutty Professor, 10 Things I Hate About You 
Writer and director Caroline Thompson 1978, screenplays for Edward Scissorhands, The Addams Family, The Secret Garden
Director David O. Russell 1981E
John Cerutti 1982, major-league baseball pitcher and broadcaster
Writer and director Susannah Grant 1984, screenplays, Pocahontas, Ever After, Erin Brockovich
Actor John Michael Higgins 1985
Musician Jonatha Brooke Mallet 1985, singer-songwriter
Musician Jennifer Kimball 1986, singer-songwriter, multi-instrumentalist
Composer Harold Meltzer 1988, 2004 Rome Prize, 2004 Charles Ives Fellowship
Actor Jeffrey Wright 1987, Tony Award–, Emmy Award–, and Golden Globe Award–winning actor
Actor/Comedian Matt Besser 1989, founder of the Upright Citizens Brigade
Actor John Cariani 1991, on Law & Order and in the musicals Something Rotten! and The Band's Visit
Actress Sarah Goldberg 1996, on 7th Heaven and Judging Amy
Composer Harris Wulfson 1996
Actor Hamish Linklater 1998, on The New Adventures of Old Christine and American Dreams
Actor Rob Brown 2006, on Coach Carter and Finding Forrester; lead role of Ernie Davis in The Express: The Ernie Davis Story
Comedian, actress, and writer Aparna Nancherla 2005, on Totally Biased with W. Kamau Bell
Podcaster David Chen, 2006, host and producer of /Film and The Tobolowsky Files
Musician Tim Eriksen of folk-punk band Cordelia's Dad
Actor and playwright Everett Glass
Radio and TV show host Dr. Drew Pinsky
Musician Chelsea Cutler, singer-songwriter, producer

Artisans
 Printer Ronald Gordon 1965, established the Oliphant Press, New York City

Authors and artists

 Author Jerome Allen 1851
 Author Charles Hallock 1854
 Editor and author William Hayes Ward 1856, editor-in-chief of the New York Independent
 Architect William Rutherford Mead 1867, of McKim, Mead, and White (appears above)
 Editor Benjamin Eli Smith 1877
 Sculptor Edward C. Potter ex 1882, of the New York Public Library Main Branch lions
 Author Herbert Dickinson Ward 1884, also wrote extensively for newspapers and periodicals
 Journalist George B. Mallon 1887, an editor and writer for The Sun
 Journalist Gilbert Hovey Grosvenor 1897, father of photojournalism; first full-time editor of National Geographic Magazine
 Writer Walter Alden Dyer 1900, author and journalist
 Author Edward Deming Andrews 1916, historian and leading authority on the Shakers
 Poet and essayist Joseph Moncure March 1920, The Wild Party and The Set-Up
 Painter Jared French 1925, master of magic realism
 Writer Wylie Sypher 1927
 Children's author Philip D. Eastman 1933
 Journalist Alfred Friendly 1933, managing editor of the Washington Post (appears above)
 Poet Richard Wilbur 1942, won two Pulitzer Prizes and was Poet Laureate of the United States (appears above)
 French poet Andre du Bouchet ex 1945, won "Prix national de poesie" (National Poetry Prize – France)
 Writer Thomas Flanagan 1945, National Book Critics Circle Award (1979)
 Author and historian Charles Patterson 1958
 Artist Thomas Cornell 1959, painter and printmaker; Professor of Art at Bowdoin College
 Architect John S. Hagmann 1959
 Journalist Warren Olney 1959, host, executive producer of PRI program To the Point; Emmy Award
 Poet and painter Stephen Rodefer 1963, one of founders of the Language Poetry Movement
 Translator, anthologist, poet, and author Stephen Mitchell 1964
 Comic book artist and writer Walt Simonson 1968, winner of multiple Shazam awards and 2010 Hero Initiative Lifetime Achievement Award
 Sports columnist Thomas Boswell 1969
 Journalist Andrew Nagorski 1969, senior editor at Newsweek
 Painter Terry Rodgers 1969
 Novelist Scott F. Turow 1970, The Burden of Proof, Presumed Innocent; also a practising lawyer
 Literary critic and novelist Fred Pfeil 1971, O. Henry Award, New York Times "Notable Book of the Year"
 Journalist Jonathan Landman 1974, deputy managing editor of the New York Times
 Cullen Murphy 1974, editor of the Atlantic Monthly and writer, Prince Valiant comic strip
 Novelist J. G. Sandom 1978, writer of thrillers, mysteries; also founded first interactive advertising agency
 Novelist John Ross 1979, Unintended Consequences, also the designer of a version of the Smith & Wesson .500 Magnum revolver
 Novelist Chris Bohjalian 1982, his novel Midwives was a Publishers Weekly best book and an Oprah Winfrey book club selection
 Author and journalist Ted Conover 1983, National Book Critics Circle Award in Nonfiction (2000)
 FoxTrot cartoonist William J. C. Amend III 1984
 Novelist Harlan F. Coben 1984, first writer to receive an Edgar, a Shamus, and an Anthony Award
 Journalist Kate Seelye 1984
 Novelist David Foster Wallace 1985 (appears above)
 Novelist Dan Brown 1986, author of The Da Vinci Code
 Photographer Michael Light 1986, creator of the books Full Moon and 100 Suns
 Cookbook author and vegan activist Tracye McQuirter, 1988
 Novelist Margaret Stohl 1989, author of thirteen novels including Beautiful Creatures and many Marvel comics
 Novelist Alan Lelchuk, Visiting Writer 1982–1984
 Poet Rafael Campo 1987, also a practising physician; professor of medicine, Harvard Medical School
 Artist and professor Sonya Clark 1989, United States Artists Fellow 2011, Pollock-Krasner Foundation Award 2006
 Poet Dan Chiasson 1993, recipient of the Pushcart Prize and a Whiting Writer's Award
 Novelist Calvin Baker 1994, author of Naming the New World, Once Two Heroes, and Dominion
 Get Fuzzy cartoonist Darby N. Conley 1994
 Artist and author Jonathon Keats 1994
 Author Julie Powell 1995
 Author and editor Bill Wasik 1996, editor at Wired, inventor of the flash mob
 Playwright Amy Fox 1997
 Artist and realist painter Graydon Parrish 1999
 Author Lauren Groff 2001, recipient of the Pushcart Prize and author of The Monsters of Templeton and Delicate Edible Birds
 Writer and Journalist Aatish Taseer 2001
 Author Carl Vigeland, Associate Secretary for Public Affairs 1978-1983

Military

 Amiel Weeks Whipple ex 1840, Brigadier General, Brevet Major General, Civil War
 Edward Duffield Neill 1842, army and hospital chaplain in Union Army, Civil War; private secretary of presidents Abraham Lincoln and Andrew Johnson
 Francis Amasa Walker 1860, brevet brigadier general (II Corps, Army of the Potomac), Civil War
 Dwight W. Morrow 1895, chief civilian aide to General John J. Pershing, World War I
 Albert E. Austin 1899, regimental surgeon, World War I
 John J. McCloy 1919, U.S. Distinguished Service Medal; Legion of Honor (France); Sylvanus Thayer Award
 John Michael Murphy ex 1943, U.S. Distinguished Service Cross, Korean War
 Robert McAfee Brown 1943, United States Navy chaplain
 Admiral Stansfield Turner (ret) ex 1945, former commander-in-chief Allied Forces Southern Europe within NATO; commander U.S. forces in Japan and Korea; commander of U.S. Second Fleet
 Paul Rieckhoff 1998, served in the U.S. Army in Iraq War, nationally recognized authority on war in Iraq issues pertaining to troops, military families, and veterans; founder and executive director of IAVA; author of Chasing Ghosts

Other notables

 John Henry Boalt 1857, engineer, lawyer, and judge; namesake of the school of law (Boalt Hall) at the University of California, Berkeley
 Robert Billingham 1979, Olympic silver medalist in sailing (1988, Soling Class)
 Eric Britton 1960, political scientist and sustainability activist
 Don Cohan 1951, Olympic bronze medalist in sailing (1972, Dragon Class)
 Joseph Gallup Cochran 1842, American Presbyterian missionary to Qajar Iran
 Kelly Close 1990, diabetes patient advocate
 Ruth Davidon 1987, gold and silver medalist, 1994 Goodwill Games
 Orson Squire Fowler 1834, Phrenologist
 Sylvester Graham ex 1827, American reformer, temperance minister, and father of Graham crackers
 Jim Guest 1962, President, Consumers Union
 J. Franklin Jameson 1879, received first doctorate in history at Johns Hopkins University, instrumental in founding National Archives
 James Jordan 1952, best known for his work at BBDO advertising agency
 Theodore Levin 1973, ethnomusicologist
 Asa Lovejoy 1830 (?), Oregon pioneer; co-founder, city of Portland; mayor, Oregon City; speaker of house of Oregon Territorial Legislature
 Richmond Mayo-Smith 1875 Economist
 Augustus Post 1895, founder of the American Automobile Association (AAA), early aviator, and American adventurer
 Jonathan D. Torrance, Amherst student who died in a class hazing accident in 1847
 William James Rolfe 1849, Shakespearean scholar
 Kimmie Weeks 2005, global activist and humanitarian who founded Youth Action International
 Walter Zanger 1956, Rabbi, tour guide and television personality

Notable faculty

Wande Abimbola, Scholar in Residence (Comparative Religious Ethics), in the early 1980s and 1990s
Charles Baker Adams 1834, Prof. of Astronomy, Zoology, and Natural Sciences, 1847–1853
Hadley Arkes, Prof. of Political Science since 1966
Clarence Edwin Ayres, Prof. of Economics, 1920–1923, principal thinker of the Texas school of institutional economics
Theodore Baird, Prof. of English, 1927–1969
Elso Sterrenberg Barghoorn, Prof. of Paleobotany and Paleontology, 1941–1946
Amrita Basu, Prof. of Political Science (South Asian politics, Women's Studies), 1981–1987, 1989–present
David W. Blight, Prof. of History, 1990–2003, winner of Bancroft Prize, Lincoln Prize
George B. Churchill 1889, Prof. of English Literature, 1898–1925
Henry Steele Commager, Prof. of History, 1956–1992
Constance Congdon, Playwright-in-Residence, 1993–2018
Benjamin DeMott, Prof. of Humanities, 1950–1990, 1990–2005 (Emeritus)
Lawrence Douglas, Prof. of Law, Jurisprudence and Social Thought since 1991, Andrew Carnegie Fellow
Benjamin Kendall Emerson 1865, Prof. of Geology, 1872–1917 (appears above)
Robert Frost, Prof. of English, 1916–1938, winner of four Pulitzer Prizes and the Bollingen Prize
Norton Garfinkle, Prof. of Economics and Economic History, c. 1957–1967
Alexander George, Prof. of Philosophy 
Edward Hitchcock, noted geologist and the third President of Amherst College (1845–1854)
George Kateb, Prof. of Political Science, 1957–1987
Nicholas Kurti, former Distinguished Visiting Prof. of Physics, a leading experimental physicist in his era
Anthony Lake, Prof. of International Relations, 1981–1984, former National Security Advisor
Henry Littlefield, dean of students, football and wrestling coach, 1968–1976, known for his political interpretation of The Wonderful Wizard of Oz
Archibald MacLeish, Prof. of English, 1963–1967, winner of three Pulitzer Prizes; the National Book Award; the Bollingen Prize; an Academy Award (screenplay); Librarian of Congress; Presidential Medal of Freedom
Jen Manion, Prof. of History and Sexuality, Women's and Gender Studies, historian, author
Jim Mauldon, Walker Professor of Mathematics (retired 1990)
Hermann J. Muller, Prof. of Biology, 1940–1945, winner of the 1946 Nobel Prize in Physiology or Medicine
Roland Merullo, Prof. of Creative Writing 2002–2003, novelist and memoirist
Austin Sarat, Prof. of Political Science and Law, Jurisprudence and Social Thought since 1974
Eric Sawyer, Prof. of Music (composition and theory) since 2002, award-winning composer
John Servos, Prof. of Science, past president of the History of Science Society
Anita Shreve, Prof. of Creative Writing in the 1990s, award-winning author of fiction and non-fiction
Henry Preserved Smith 1869, Prof. of Religion, 1897–1906
Lewis Spratlan, Prof. of Music, 1970–2006, 2006 (Emeritus), winner of the 2000 Pulitzer Prize in music
Ilan Stavans, Prof. of Spanish since 1993
William Taubman, Prof. of Political Science; winner of the 2004 Pulitzer Prize in biography and the 2003 National Book Critics Circle Award in biography
Rowland Abiodun, Prof. of Art, the History of Art, and Black Studies,1997 - present, distinguished author and historian of African Art
Robert Thurman, Prof. of Religion, 1973–1988, selected by Time magazine as one of the 25 most influential Americans
Ronald Tiersky, Prof. of Political Science since 1973
Jim Ostendarp, head football coach 1959–1991, president of the American Football Coaches Association 1982
David Peck Todd 1875, Prof. of Astronomy, 1881–1917, 1917 (Emeritus) (appears above)
William Seymour Tyler, 1830, Prof. of Latin, Greek, and Greek literature, 1836–1893
Stark Young, Prof. of English, 1915–1921, Order of the Crown of Italy
Colston Warne, Prof. of Economics, 1930–1969, co-founder of Consumers Union, and president of its board of directors 1936–1979
Perez Zagorin, Prof. of History, 1947–1949

References

External links 
 

Amherst College people
Amherst College